Sander Keller (born 18 September 1979) is a Dutch football coach and former footballer. He played as a defender for Utrecht, RBC Roosendaal, Neuchâtel Xamax and Almere City. He is currently an assistant coach at Utrecht.

Playing career

Born in Amsterdam, Keller began his career at his local club, Zeeburgia, at the age of six. He played regularly for the team before being spotted by Ajax youth scouts. He was then offered a place in the Ajax Academy a year later, and started practicing with the club.

In 1999, Keller wanted to play more matches, and therefore he joined Utrecht. There, he only made one appearance, and therefore joined RBC Roosendaal, where he played 25 matches in his first season, but he could not prevent the club from suffering relegation. Eventually, he would make 77 appearances for RBC, before moving returning to Utrecht.

In Utrecht, he now played often in the Utrecht defense. In Utrecht, Keller enjoyed many successful years, including winning the KNVB Beker once and playing six UEFA Cup matches. In the 2006–07 season, Keller could not count on a place in the starting eleven. Therefore, he went on a look for a new club. He did not find any, and the following summer he renewed his contract until 2010. Since the 2007–08 season, he played regularly and became a stable defender.

Keller signed a one-and-half-year contract with Swiss side Neuchâtel Xamax on 11 January 2011. On 2 January 2012, Keller was to sign a loan with De Graafschap until the end of the season but the deal broke. Xamax went bankrupt shortly after his return to the club.

In June 2012, Keller signed a three-year contract with Dutch club Almere City. He retired from professional football after having played three seasons with the club, in July 2015. Afterwards, he played for one season at amateur club VV De Meern, but retired altogether due to recurring injuries.

Managerial career
In September 2015, Keller became a coach in the youth department of his former club, Utrecht, initially focusing on the U14 team. In November 2020, Keller was appointed assistant to first-team head coach René Hake.

Career statistics

Honours
Utrecht
KNVB Cup: 2003–04

References

External links
 Voetbal International profile 

1979 births
Living people
Association football central defenders
Dutch footballers
Dutch expatriate footballers
FC Utrecht players
RBC Roosendaal players
A.V.V. Zeeburgia players
Neuchâtel Xamax FCS players
Eredivisie players
Eerste Divisie players
Swiss Super League players
Expatriate footballers in Switzerland
Dutch expatriate sportspeople in Switzerland
Footballers from Amsterdam
Dutch football managers
FC Utrecht non-playing staff